Tylopilus subvinaceipallidus is a bolete fungus found in New South Wales, Australia.

References

External links

subvinaceipallidus
Fungi described in 1999
Fungi of Australia
Taxa named by Roy Watling